Kamwenge District is a district in Western Uganda. It is named after its 'chief town', Kamwenge, where the district headquarters are located. Kamwenge District is part of the Kingdom of Toro, one of the ancient traditional monarchies in Uganda. The kingdom is coterminous with Toro sub-region. The districts that constitute the sub-region are: (a) Bunyangabu District (b) Kabarole District (c) Kamwenge District (d) Kyegegwa District (e) Kitagwenda District and (f) Kyenjojo District.

Location
Kamwenge District is bordered by Kyenjojo District to the north, Kyegegwa District and Kiruhura District to the northeast, Ibanda District to the east and southeast, Kitagwenda District to the south, Kasese District to the west Bunyangabu District and Kabarole District to the northwest.

The geographical coordinates of Kamwenge District are:0°14'11.0"N, 30°29'30.0"E (Latitude:0.236389; Longitude:30.491667).

Overview
The district was created in 2000 by Act of Parliament. Prior to then, it was part of Kabarole District. It covers an area of approximately 1788.5Km2.  2.6% is covered by open water. It is predominantly a rural district with some of the worst poverty levels in the country. The district has one hospital-Rukunyu in Kahunge sub county on Kamwenge Fortportal road.

Kamwenge shares boundaries with eight Districts namely; Kasese in the West, Kabarole and Bunyangabu in the North West and extreme North, Kyenjojo in the North and Kyegegwa in North East, Kazo in the East, Kitagwenda in the south,  and Ibanda in the South East. The population projection for 2018 is 270,668 of which males are 132,537 and female 138,131. The population is forecasted to grow at 3.3% per annum. MAIN ECONOMIC ACTIVITY 
Agro processing and commercial farming are the major economic activities and source of livelihood in the district. Bananas dominate the grown tradable crops followed by maize, cassava and sweet potatoes. Other crops include sorghum, millet, groundnuts, beans, tea, coffee, cotton, nuts, beans, tea, coffee, cotton, tomatoes, cabbage, onions and pineapples, which are all grown on small scale mainly for subsistence. There is also animal husbandry. The District population is also engaged in agro-forestry, aquaculture, apiaries
The coming of Congolese refugees affected cattle keepers in the area as they were displaced and had to relocate to other places within and outside the district. Land in the refuge settlement is now used for agricultural production especially maize, beans and Irish potatoes; the area has become a business centre attracting traders from the whole country. 
The growth of rural trading centres, which is, attributed to increased road network especially those opened under Development Response to Displacement Impact Project (DRDIP), Uganda National Roads Authority (UNRA), Uganda Road Fund and UNHCR. This has also created great impact on business opportunities. Similarly, the ongoing rural electrification programme targeting the entire District has increased linear settlements thus changing land use patterns to small-scale informal sector activities like welding, value addition in agriculture and other related occupations.
The natural beauty of flora and fauna of Kibale forest has made Kamwenge a tourist destination, which hosts an estimated 12,455 tourists annually. Katonga game reserve also has its unique tourist attractions that influence land use with the neighbouring pastoralist communities and some land encroachers who have been battling with government over rights to occupation.

The district is endowed with numerous wetlands, tropical forests, grasslands and woodlands in the Kibale National Park shared with Kabarole District and Katonga game reserve, which it shares with Kazo District and Kyegegwa District. Other natural resources include Limestone, Gold, Tin, Marble, Sand, Clay and stone quarries.
Other natural endowments include:
 River Rushango
 Katonga Nature Reserve

'WHY INVEST IN KAMWENGE DISTRICT'
Infrastructure'''
•	Roads: The Government of Uganda has invested in upgrading two major roads connecting to Kamwenge, making it easily accessible from Kampala, Mbarara, Ibanda and Fort portal. These are (i) Lyantonde-Nyakahita-Kiruhura-Ibanda-Kamwenge; 
ii) Mbarara – Ibanda – Kamwenge; iii) Kampala-Mubende-Kihura-Rwamwanja-Kamwenge; Kamwenge-Kabujogera-Mahyoro-Kyambura-Kasese/or Mbarara via Ishaka-Bushenyi and (iv) Fort-Portal to Kamwenge.
•	Electricity: Reliable electricity is generated by Mpanga Power Station, an 18 megawatts mini hydroelectric power project.
•	Real Estate Development: Kamwenge town hosts a wide range of housing including permanent commercial buildings, office buildings, permanent residential houses and apartment blocks. Many hotels offer amenities and comfortable ambience for both tourists and business people.
•	Financial Infrastructure: The district has three commercial banks namely Finance Trust, Centenary and Post Bank. There are various Microfinance institutions, Savings and Credit Cooperative Societies (SACCOs) as well as Farmer Cooperatives. A wide network of Banks is concentrated in Kabarole and Ibanda Districts, in the proximity of Kamwenge.
•	Railway transport: According to the NDPII (2015/16-2019/20), plans are under way to boost economic activity of Kamwenge through planned infrastructure projects like the Standard Gauge Railway Network where Kamwenge will be directly connected to Mombasa (Kenya) and Mpondwe (DRC).

VIABLE INVESTMENT OPPORTUNITIES IN KAMWENGE DISTRICT
•	Tourism- Accommodation, Tents, Cottages, tree houses, tourism information centre and hub at Bigodi.
•	Commercial farming: Agriculture technologies, Seed multiplication, coffee processing plants including milk coolers and processing plants.
•	Fish farming based on the wealth of wetlands
•	Agricultural mechanisation
•	Establishment of mini irrigation for tea, vegetables, and coffee farmers as well as mini valley dams to provide water for production  
•	Mineral exploration and production

Population
The national population census and household survey of 27 August 2014 enumerated the population of Kamwenge District at 414,454 inhabitants. The same census enumerated the population of Kitagwenda District at 165,354. In July 2019, Kitagwenda District was carved out of Kamwenge, leaving a population of 249,100, in 2014 numbers.

Ethnicities and languages
The predominant ethnic group in the district are Bakiga, followed by Bafumbira. Other tribes include the indigenous Batoro; Batagwenda, Banyarwanda and several other tribes . Bakiga from Kabale District settled in the district in the late 1960s and early 1950s. The languages spoken include:

Economic activities
Agriculture is the mainstay of the district economy. Crops raised include:

Prominent people 
Frank Tumwebaze a Ugandan educator and politician. He is the current Cabinet Minister of Information Technology and Communications in the Cabinet of Uganda. He was appointed to that position on 6 June 2016
Abigaba Cuthbert Mirembe a Ugandan engineer and current Member Parliament for Kibale County
Nsheija Dorothy Kabaritsya , former Woman Member of Parliament.
 Sylvia Bahireira Tumwekwase, the current woman member of parliament representing the district.

Urban centres
There are many developing urban centres in the district. This is partly due to population increase and development of trading centres and rural electrification. The major urban centres include:
Kamwenge: the chief town of the district.
Kahunge : another town council within the district.
Biguri: a settlement in the district
Bigodi: another settlement in the district.

Geographical features
Its foothills contain farming homesteads and small communities of both temporary and permanent structures.

See also
 Kamwenge
 List of massacres in Uganda
 Toro sub-region
 Western Region, Uganda
 Districts of Uganda

References

External links

 Kamwenge District Official Website

 
Districts of Uganda
Western Region, Uganda